Micromonospora maris is a Gram-positive bacterium from the genus Micromonospora which has been isolated from deep-sea sediments from the Sea of Japan. Verrucosispora maris produces abyssomicins and proximicins.

References

Further reading

External links
Type strain of Verrucosispora maris at BacDive -  the Bacterial Diversity Metadatabase

Micromonosporaceae
Bacteria described in 2012